The 2021 World Series of Poker Online was the second annual series of online poker tournaments organized by the World Series of Poker (WSOP).

There were WSOP bracelet events held across two online sites, WSOP.com and GGPoker. The WSOP.com schedule began on July 1 for players located in New Jersey and Nevada and featured 33 events.

In July, to mark the opening of WSOP.com to players in Pennsylvania, the WSOP announced an additional series of eight bracelet events that will run from August 8-15.

The GGPoker portion of the schedule, for players outside the United States, ran from August 1-September 12. There were also 33 bracelet events, culminating in the $5,000 Main Event with a $20 million guaranteed prize pool.

The live portion of the WSOP began at the Rio All-Suite Hotel and Casino on September 30.

WSOP.com Schedule

Source: 

Key: (bracelet number for 2021/bracelet number for career)

Nevada and New Jersey

Pennsylvania

GGPoker Schedule

Source:

Key: (bracelet number for 2021/bracelet number for career)

Main Event

The $5,000 No Limit Hold'em Main Event began on August 22 with the first of 27 starting flights. Players were able to re-enter a maximum of three times. Day 1 survivors returned on September 5 to play down to the final table.

The Main Event attracted 4,092 players, falling $563,000 short of the $20 million guaranteed prize pool. The final table was played on September 11, with the champion earning $2,543,073.

*Career statistics prior to the Main Event

References

External links
Official site
GGPoker

World Series of Poker
World Series of Poker